Watashi wo Mitsukete is the third album by Yoko Takahashi.

Track listing

1994 albums
Yoko Takahashi albums